Super Hits -- later retitled AM Gold -- was a 35-volume series issued by Time Life during the 1990s and 2000s, spotlighting popular music—primarily, soft rock and non-disco Top 40 music—played on Top 40 radio stations during the 1960s and 1970s.

Much like Time-Life's other series chronicling popular music, volumes in the "AM Gold" series covered a specific time period, including single years in some volumes and stylistic trends in others; in addition, one volume focused on the music of The Carpenters. Each volume was issued on a compact disc, cassette or (on "Super Hits"-titled volumes issued in 1990) 2-LP vinyl record set. Individual volumes generally contained 22 tracks, and represented the highlighted time period's most popular and noteworthy tracks. Also included was a booklet, containing liner notes written by some of the most respected historians of the genre, photographs of the artists, and information on the songs (writers, performers and peak position on Billboard magazine'''s Hot 100 chart).

History
As "Super Hits"
The series originally titled "Super Hits" was first issued in the summer of 1990, with the first volume in the series titled Super Hits: 1966. The original "Super Hits" series included volumes for the years 1962-1973, while the volumes that covered the early 1960s in general also included music from 1960-1961. The "Super Hits" volumes can be identified by artist drawings of scenes from Americana (for instance, the 1965 volume had a drawing of a Ford Mustang on its cover).

The original "Super Hits" series saw 20 volumes issued and continued through 1993, the last volume spotlighting the music of The Carpenters.

As was the case for many various artists compilations spotlighting 1960s music, including Time-Life's Classic Rock series, tracks by The Beatles and The Rolling Stones were not included due to licensing restrictions.

As "AM Gold"
The series was revived as "AM Gold" in 1995, with a different cover design (early volumes had an artist's drawing of a pocket transistor radio, with later volumes bearing a "gold record" with the year or era spotlighted emblazoned over the top). The first 20 volumes were re-titled issues of volumes from the former "Super Hits" series with identical track lineups, while new volumes covering the mid- and late-1970s (including individual volumes for each of the years 1974-1979) were included. As the series was meant to highlight soft rock music, disco songs—which had also gained a significant foothold on Top 40 radio in the United States—were generally not included, although some "edgier" pop music (for example, Blondie's "Heart of Glass") were included.

The "AM Gold" series continued through 1997, with a volume titled AM Gold: TV Themes of the'60s being the last to be issued; after a short break, several more volumes were issued through 2002, the last titled AM Gold: Perfect Harmony.

In 1998, Time-Life issued two "budget" box sets, each containing three CDs or cassettes of 12 songs each, for retail sale. These were titled "AM Gold" and "AM Gold II: Radio Hits '69-'74."

Availability
As was the case with Time-Life's other series, "Super Hits"/"AM Gold" was advertised in television and magazine advertisements. The series was available by subscription (by calling a 1-800 number); those who purchased the series in that fashion received a new volume roughly every other month (on the format of their choice), and had the option of keeping the volumes they wanted.

Each volume was also offered for individual sale. When the series was fully issued, a customer could purchase the entire series at once (or a group of albums, as packaged by Time-Life as part of a promotion), often at a discounted price.

Time-Life continued to offer "AM Gold" through the mid-2000s (decade), after which it was replaced by other series.

The series
As with many of Time-Life Records' multi-volume releases, the volumes were not issued in a logical, sequential order by date or era of the subject; that is, issuing volumes covering 1962 and the early 1960s before progressing to 1963. In the track information section, the volumes will be listed sequentially by era; the following list is the order in which the volumes were released.

Super Hits

1990
 Super Hits: 1966 Super Hits: 1968 Super Hits: 1965 Super Hits: 19701991
 Super Hits: 1967 Super Hits: 1962 Super Hits: 1969 Super Hits: 1963 Super Hits: 1964 Super Hits: 1971 Super Hits: 1972 Super Hits: The Mid-1960s1992
 Super Hits: 1973 Super Hits: The Late-1960s Super Hits: The Early-1960s Super Hits: The Early-1970s Super Hits: Mid-1960s Classics Super Hits: Late-1960s Classics Super Hits: Early-1960s Classics Super Hits: Early-1970s Classics1993
 Super Hits: The CarpentersAM Gold

1995
 AM Gold: 1969 AM Gold: 1970 AM Gold: 1973 AM Gold: 1968 AM Gold: The Mid '60s AM Gold: 1971 AM Gold: 1972 AM Gold: 1967 AM Gold: 1966 AM Gold: 1965 AM Gold: 1964 AM Gold: Late '60s Classics AM Gold: The Early '70s AM Gold: The Late '60s AM Gold: Early '70s Classics AM Gold: Mid '60s Classics AM Gold: 1963 AM Gold: 1962 AM Gold: The Early '60s AM Gold: Early '60s Classics AM Gold: 1961 AM Gold: 19601996
 AM Gold: 1974 AM Gold: 1975 AM Gold: 1976 AM Gold: TV Themes of the '60s1997
 AM Gold: 1977 AM Gold: 1978 AM Gold: 19791999
 AM Gold: Teen Idols of the 70s AM Gold: #1 Hits of the '70s - '70-'742000
 AM Gold: #1 Hits of the '70s - '75-'79 AM Gold: Mellow Hits of the '70s2001
 AM Gold: The '60s Generation AM Gold: Smash Hits of the '70s2002
 AM Gold: Perfect Harmony''

References

External links
 Time-Life Music official site – for a listing of current products
 Time-Life Album Discography, Part 22: AM Gold

Compilation album series
Rock compilation albums